Norway has issued stamps since 1855, and the first person to appear on a Norwegian stamp was the joint Norwegian king Oscar I in 1856 ( katalogue FACIT) the second Norwegian-Swedish king Oscar II in 1878. The first non-royal person to appear on a Norwegian stamp was the playwright Henrik Ibsen, to commemorate the centenary of his birth in 1928 followed by the mathematician Niels Henrik Abel later the same year.

Queen Maud was the first woman to appear on a Norwegian stamp, in 1939, followed by her daughter-in-law Märtha in 1956. The first non-royal woman was author Camilla Collett in 1963.

To the matter of "who's first", several non-royal persons appeared on a 1914 stamp commemorating the centenary of the Constitution of Norway, as the stamp depicted the renowned painting of the 1814 assembly. This list does however only include persons depicted as themselves per se, and does not include stamps where persons appear as a representative of their profession, such as post officers, brass band members etc. The list also excludes persons that are represented on paintings.

A-E
Niels Henrik Abel, mathematician – 1928, 1983, 2002, 2002
Roald Amundsen, explorer – 1947, 1961, 1971
Hjalmar Andersen, (stamp includes his  "Hjallis"), winter athlete – 1990
Herman Anker, Folk high school pioneer – 1964
Colin Archer, boat constructor – 1941
Klas Pontus Arnoldson Nobel laureate – 1968
Olaus Arvesen, Folk high school pioneer – 1964
Torgeir Augundsson  "Myllarguten", fiddler – 1985
Kjell Aukrust, artist/author – 1988 (through his work)
Berit Aunli, winter athlete – 1989
Aung San Suu Kyi, Nobel laureate – 2001
Fredrik Bajer, Nobel laureate – 1968
Norma Balean, actress – 2002
Ivar Ballangrud, winter athlete – 1990
Arnfinn Bergmann, winter athlete – 1992
Vilhelm Bjerknes, meteorologist – 1962
Ole Einar Bjørndalen, skiløper – 2006
Bjørnstjerne Bjørnson, Nobel author – 1932, 1982, 2003
Johan Borgen, author – 2002
Hjalmar Branting, Nobel laureate – 1981
Trygve Bratteli, prime minister – 2005
Hallgeir Brenden, winter athlete – 1992
Ole Jakob Broch, meter convention – 1975
Waldemar Christofer Brøgger, geologist – 1974
Ole Bull, fiddler – 1985
Aase Bye, actress – 2001
Lalla Carlsen, actress – 2001
Johan Castberg, social welfare pioneer – 1993
Christian IV, Danish–Norwegian king – 1988, 2000 (statue),
Camilla Collett, author – 1963
Egil Danielsen, athlete – 1961
Petter Dass, baroque psalmist – 1948, 1997
Carl Deichman, Oslo library patron – 1985
Kari Diesen, actress – 2001
Henry Dunant, Red Cross founder, Nobel laureate – 1961, 2001
Olav Duun, author – 1976
Johanne Dybwad, actress – 1967
Bjørn Dæhlie, winter athlete – 1993
Hans Egede, missionary to Greenland – 1986
Thorbjørn Egner, children's author – 1984 (through his work)
Stein Eriksen, winter athlete – 1992

F-J
Johan Falkberget, author – 1979
Christian Magnus Falsen, constitution father – 1947
Kirsten Flagstad, opera diva – 1995
Svend Foyn, whaler – 1947
Arne Garborg, author – 1951 (first Noreg stamp)
Einar Gerhardsen, prime minister – 1997
Henry Gleditsch, actor – 2002
Victor Goldschmidt, geologist – 1974
Mikhail Gorbachev, Nobel laureate – 2001
Edvard Grieg, composer – 1943, 1983, 1993,
Nordahl Grieg, author – 2002
Johan Grøttumsbråten, winter athlete – 1991
Cathinka Guldberg, nurse – 1968
Cato Guldberg, chemist, law of mass action – 1964
Johan Ernst Gunnerus, bishop, botanist, founder of scientific society – 1970
Gro Hammerseng, Handball player – 2008
Gerhard Armauer Hansen, physician, leprosy discoverer – 1973
Christopher Hansteen, geophysicist – 1984
Harald, king – 1982, 1992, 1993, 1994, 1995, 1997,
Odd Hassel, Nobel laureate – 2004
Thorleif Haug, winter athlete – 1990
Axel Heiberg, founder of forest society – 1948
Sonja Henie, winter athlete, ice princess, actress – 1990
Johan Hjort, fisheries researcher – 1969
Ludvig Holberg, Danish–Norwegian playwright – 1934, 1984,
Haakon IV Haakonson, medieval king – 2004
Haakon VII, king of Norway – 1907, 1909, 1910, 1937, 1943(1945), 1945, 1946, 1947, 1947, 1947, 1950,  1951, 1955, 1957, 1972, 1982, 1995, 1998,  2003, 2005, 2005, 2007
Haakon, crown prince – 1997
Henrik Ibsen, playwright – 1928, 1978
Lillebil Ibsen, actress, dancer – 2001
Ingrid Alexandra, princess – 2004, 2005
Gunnar Isachsen, Arctic explorer – 2006
Finn Christian Jagge, winter athlete – 1993
Anne Jahren, winter athlete – 1989
Bjørg Eva Jensen, speed skater – 1989
Knut Johannesen  "Kupper'n", winter athlete – 1991
Leif Juster, actor – 2001

K-O
Geir Karlstad, winter athlete – 1993
Alexander Kielland, author – 1949
Th. Kierulf, geologist – 1974
Martin Luther King Jr., Nobel laureate – 2001
Theodor Kittelsen, troll illustrator – 2007
Betzy Kjelsberg, social welfare pioneer – 1993
Asbjørn Kloster, teetotaler – 1959
Eirik Kvalfoss, winter athlete – 1989
Magnus Brostrup Landstad, hymn author, folk tune collector – 2002
Christian Lous Lange, Nobel laureate – 1981, 2004
Lars Levi Læstadius, Sámi missionary – 2000
Jonas Lie, author – 1983
Trygve Lie, UN secretary general – 1995
Magnus law-mender, medieval king – 1974
Nelson Mandela, Nobel laureate – 2001
Max Manus, war time hero, royal body guard – 2005
Maud, queen – 1939, 1947, 1969, 1982, 2003
Alfred Maurstad, actor – 2001
Tordis Maurstad, actress – 2002
Rigoberta Menchú, Nobel laureate – 2001
Christian Michelsen, prime minister of independence year – 1982, 2005
Edvard Munch, painter – 1963 (self portrait)
Magne Myrmo, winter athlete – 1979
Märtha, crown princess – 1956, 1982, 2003
Fridtjof Nansen, naturalist, explorer, refugee aid, Nobel laureate – 1935, 1940, 1947, 1961, 1982, 2001
Carsten Tank Nielsen, telegraph director – 1954
Rolf Just Nilsen, actor – 2002
Arvid Nilssen, actor – 2001
Alfred Nobel, chemist, innovator, endowed the Nobel prizes – 2001
Rikard Nordraak, composer – 1942
Inger Helene Nybråten, winter athlete – 1989
Olav V, king of Norway – 1946, 1958, 1959, 1969, 1970, 1973, 1978, 1979, 1982, 1982, 1983, 1983, 1985, 1988, 1995, 2003, 2005, 2005
Lars Onsager, Nobel laureate – 2003
Oscar II, king of Norway and Sweden – 1878

P-T
Frédéric Passy, Nobel laureate – 1961
Cleng Peerson, emigration pioneer – 1947, 1975
Britt Pettersen, winter athlete – 1989
Vidkun Quisling, quisling – 1942, 1942
Kjetil Rekdal, footballer – 2005
Terje Rollem, 1945 liberation contributor – 1995
Einar Rose, actor – 2001
Birger Ruud, winter athlete – 1991
Tom Sandberg, winter athlete – 1989
Michael Sars, biologist, father of Georg Ossian Sars – 1970
Georg Ossian Sars, biologist, son of Michael Sars – 1970
Thorleif Schjelderup, winter athlete – 1951
Tore Segelcke, actress – 2001
Hannibal Sehested, chancellor – 1947
Åse Gruda Skard, children's psychologist – 2005
Amalie Skram, author – 1996
Lars Olsen Skrefsrud, missionary – 1967
Simon Slåttvik, winter athlete – 1992
Snorri, saga author – 1941
Magnar Solberg, winter athlete – 1991
Sonja, queen – 1992, 1993, 1997
Engebret Soot, canal engineer – 1986
Hans Strøm, priest, topographic author – 1970
Eilert Sundt, social scientist – 1964
Johan Svendsen, composer – 1990
Johan Sverdrup, politician – 1966, 1984,
Otto Sverdrup, polar explorer – 2004
Harald Sæverud, composer – 1997
Nathan Söderblom, bishop, Nobel laureate – 1990
Othilie Tonning, salvationist – 1988
Kari Traa, winter athlete – 2005
Lars Tvinde, actor – 2002

U-Z
Vegard Ulvang, winter athlete – 1993
Sigrid Undset, Nobel author – 1982
Fartein Valen, composer – 1987
Halldis Moren Vesaas, poet – 2007
Tarjei Vesaas, author – 1997
Aasmund Olavsson Vinje, author – 1968
J. H. L. Vogt, geologist – 1974
Grete Waitz, runner – 1997
Henrik Wergeland, poet, humanist – 1945
Johan Herman Wessel, poet – 1942
Peter Wessel Tordenskjold, navy hero – 1947, 1990
Herman Wildenvey, poet – 1986
Hanna Winsnes, author – 1989
Richard With, coastal express pioneer – 1993
Peter Waage, chemist, law of mass action – 1964
Nic Waal, pediatric and adolescent psychiatrist – 2005

Ø-Å
Tore Ørjasæter, poet – 1986
Arnulf Øverland, poet – 1989
Per Aabel, actor – 2001
Jakob Aall, statesman – 1973
Ivar Aasen, linguist, author, nynorsk pioneer – 1963

References

Norway
Stamps, people
People on tamps
Philately of Norway